James S. Davis (born 1943) is an American billionaire businessman, the owner and chairman of New Balance, and an early investor in Major League Lacrosse.

Early life
James S. Davis was born in 1943 in Brookline, Massachusetts, the son of Greek immigrants. He attended the Worcester Academy, and he received a bachelor's degree in biology and chemistry from Middlebury College in 1966. While in college, he played college football.

Career
Davis started his career as a sales engineer at the LFE Corporation in Waltham, Massachusetts, and as marketing manager for the Applied Geodata Systems Division of Techven Associates of Cambridge, Massachusetts. In 1972, he bought New Balance, then only a 6-employee firm in Boston, and turned it into a 4,000-employee global corporation with revenues averaging around $2.5 billion every year. He has been a board member of the Sporting Goods Manufacturers Association, the International Athletic Footwear & Apparel Manufacturers Association, and the Two/Ten Foundation. He also sits on the board of directors of the Citizen's Bank in Providence, Rhode Island.

He has donated $5 million to the University of Maine. He is the recipient of  an Honorary Doctorate from his alma mater, Middlebury College. A library on its campus has also been named for him. He formerly sat on its board of trustees, on the Worcester Academy's, and on Newbury College's. He sits on the board of trustees of the Sports Museum of New England and formerly Boston Children's Museum.

As of 2017, Davis is the 324th richest person in the world, and the 94th richest in the United States, with an estimated wealth of US$5.1 billion.

Personal life
Davis is married, and has two children. He lives in Newton, Massachusetts.

Politics
Davis has donated $500,000 to Mitt Romney's Super PAC, Restore Our Future.

Davis donated almost $400,000 to the Trump Victory Committee in September 2016. In an interview given to Wall Street Journal reporter Sara Germano on the day following the 2016 presidential election of Donald Trump, a New Balance senior executive suggested support for Trump due to his opposition to the Trans-Pacific Partnership. Widely reported social-media reaction documented numerous New Balance owners destroying or disposing of their shoes—with many pledging lifetime boycotts of the company.

In 2021, Davis gave $495,000 to a super PAC supporting Boston mayoral candidate Annissa Essaibi George, who won second place in the preliminary election in September, enough to advance to the general election.

See also 
 List of Greek Americans
 List of Donald Trump presidential campaign endorsements, 2016

References

Living people
1943 births
Middlebury College alumni
Middlebury Panthers football players
People from Newton, Massachusetts
American businesspeople
American billionaires
American people of Greek descent